Bribri Sign Language is a village sign language of an indigenous Bribri community in southern Costa Rica. It is unrelated to Costa Rican Sign Language.

References

Bribri people
Village sign languages
Sign languages of Costa Rica